Filatima procedes is a moth of the family Gelechiidae. It is found in North America, where it has been recorded from Indiana, Michigan and Texas.

The wingspan is 18–20 mm. The forewings are whitish buff, the scales tipped with cinnamon-buff and somewhat suffused with fuscous. There is an ill-defined cinnamon-buff spot in the fold, at the basal third. The discal spots are small and blackish fuscous. The hindwings are shining whitish basally, shading to fuscous apically.

The larvae feed on Salix exiqua.

References

Moths described in 1947
Filatima